Carlos Asensio Cabanillas (14 November 1896, in Madrid – 28 April 1969, in Madrid) was a Spanish soldier and statesman who fought for the Nationalist faction during the Spanish Civil War, rising in command from Colonel to General in Franco's Army of Africa.

When Franco's military conspiracy flared into revolt in July 1936, Asensio Cabanillas and Colonel Sáenz de Buruaga easily secured Tétouan for the rebels. In the first month of the war his column, fighting alongside Juan Yagüe's troops, made an impressive forced march from Seville to Madrid, storming and taking the cities of Badajoz, Toledo, and Talavera. His bloody advance into the University City during the Siege of Madrid would mark the farthest Nationalist advance against the city until the end of the war. At the Jarama his column spearheaded the attack across the river but was stalled thereafter by the International Brigades.

After the war Franco promoted Asensio Cabanillas to Lieutenant General. He served as the High Commissioner of the Spanish protectorate in Morocco from 1939 to 1941, and later as the Chief of Staff of the Army from 1941 to 1942, Minister of the Army from 1942 to 1945 and Captain General of the Balearic Islands from 1945 to 1948. Finally, he served as the Chief of the Defence High Command (chief of staff of the Spanish Armed Forces), from 1955 to 1958.

Asensio Cabanillas died in 1969.

References

1890s births
1969 deaths
Military personnel from Madrid
Spanish lieutenant generals
People of the Rif War
Spanish military personnel of the Spanish Civil War (National faction)
Francoist Spain
Politicians from Madrid
Defence ministers of Spain
Government ministers during the Francoist dictatorship